The Yaregskoye Oil Field is an oil field located in Komi Republic. It was discovered in 1994 and developed by Lukoil. The oil field is operated and owned by Lukoil.

References 

Oil fields of Russia